Izaro is a Basque feminine given name which is a name of an  island located in Mundaka. It was among the 10 most popular names given to newborn girls in Basque Country, Spain in 2011.

Notes

Feminine given names
Basque feminine given names